Tikhon Yevgenyevich Moiseev (born 1978) is a Russian mathematician, Professor, Dr.Sc., a professor at the Faculty of Computer Science at the Moscow State University. Corresponding Member of the Russian Academy of Sciences.

He defended the thesis "On the solvability of boundary value problems for the Lavrent'ev-Bitsadze equation with mixed boundary conditions" for the degree of Doctor of Physical and Mathematical Sciences (2013).

Author more than 50 scientific articles.

He is the son of famed mathematician Evgeny Moiseev.

References

Bibliography

External links
 Russian Academy of Sciences
 MSU CMC
 Scientific works of Tikhon Moiseev
 Scientific works of Tikhon Moiseev

Russian computer scientists
Russian mathematicians
Academic staff of Moscow State University
1978 births
Living people
Moscow State University alumni